1964/1985 Affinità-Divergenze fra il Compagno Togliatti e Noi – Del Conseguimento della Maggiore Età (1964/1985 Affinities-Divergences between comrade Togliatti and us – Of the coming of age) is the debut album by the Italian punk rock band CCCP Fedeli alla linea. It was first released on vinyl by Attack Punk Records, an independent label, in 1986, and then re-released on CD by Virgin Records in 1988.

This album is considered by many music critics one of the masterpieces of contemporary Italian music, and a milestone for the whole European punk movement.

Track listing 

 "Mi Ami?" and "Emilia Paranoica" originally appeared respectively on the "Ortodossia II" and "Compagni, Cittadini, Fratelli, Partigiani" EPs, and are included in this album as remixed versions.

Personnel 

 Giovanni Lindo Ferretti – vocals
 Massimo Zamboni – guitar
 Umberto Negri – bass, drum machine
 Danilo Fatur – “Artista del popolo”
 Annarella Giudici – “Benemerita soubrette”

See also
 CCCP discography
 Consorzio Suonatori Indipendenti (C.S.I.)
 Per Grazia Ricevuta (PGR)
 Punk rock

References and footnotes

1986 debut albums
CCCP Fedeli alla linea albums
Virgin Records albums
Italian-language albums